Heikki Leppänen (born 31 August 1946) is a Finnish athlete. He competed in the men's decathlon at the 1976 Summer Olympics.

References

1946 births
Living people
Athletes (track and field) at the 1976 Summer Olympics
Finnish decathletes
Olympic athletes of Finland
Sportspeople from Tampere